Albert of Brunswick-Lüneburg may refer to:

 Albert I, Duke of Brunswick-Lüneburg (1236–1279), also called Albert the Tall
 Albert II, Duke of Brunswick-Lüneburg (c. 1268–1318), also called Albert the Fat
 Albert I, Duke of Brunswick-Grubenhagen (c. 1339 – probably 1383)
 Albert II, Duke of Brunswick-Grubenhagen (1419–1485)
 Albert II of Brunswick-Lüneburg (c. 1294–1358), Bishop of Halberstadt
 Albert II of Brunswick-Wolfenbüttel (died 1395), Archbishop of Bremen